Luch is a village in Konotop Raion, Sumy Oblast (province) of Ukraine. 

Until 18 July 2020, Luch was located in the Krolevets Raion. The raion was abolished in July 2020 as part of the administrative reform of Ukraine, which reduced the number of raions of Sumy Oblast to five. The area of Krolevets Raion was merged into Konotop Raion.

References

Notes

Villages in Konotop Raion